Saith the Lord is a short book by author Howard Wandrei that bundles a mystery story with a letter and a short autobiography. It was released in 1996 by F & B Mystery in an edition of 350 copies of which 100 were specially bound in Lexotone, signed by the editor, numbered and released in a slipcase with Wandrei's The Last Pin.  The remaining 250 copies were bound in card stock and given away to guests at the 1996 World Fantasy Convention.  The story originally appeared in the magazine Black Mask in 1940.

Contents

 Introduction, by D. H. Olson"
 "Saith the Lord"
 "A Night on the Town" (letter)
 "In His Own Words" (autobiography)

References

1996 short story collections
Mystery short story collections
Works originally published in Black Mask (magazine)
Fedogan & Bremer books